The Master Chief Petty Officer of the Coast Guard (MCPOCG) is the senior enlisted member of the U.S. Coast Guard and the principal advisor to the Commandant of the Coast Guard on all enlisted personnel matters.

The holder of this position is equivalent to the Master Chief Petty Officer of the Navy, Sergeant Major of the Marine Corps, Sergeant Major of the Army, Chief Master Sergeant of the Air Force, and Chief Master Sergeant of the Space Force, 
and by protocol, is equal to a vice admiral.

The MCPOCG is appointed by the Commandant of the Coast Guard to serve as a spokesperson to address the issues of enlisted personnel to the highest levels in the Coast Guard. As such the MCPOCG is the senior enlisted advisor to the Commandant of the Coast Guard. The MCPOCG's exact duties vary, depending on the Commandant, though generally devotes much time traveling throughout the Coast Guard observing training and communicating with Coast Guardsmen and their families. The normal tour of assignment is four years, which runs concurrently with the Commandant of the Coast Guard. The first member to hold this post was MCPOCG Charles L. Calhoun, and the current MCPOCG is Heath B. Jones who assumed office on 19 May 2022.

Master Chief Petty Officers of the Coast Guard

Timeline

See also

 Senior Enlisted Advisor to the Chairman of the Joint Chiefs of Staff
 Sergeant Major of the Army
 Sergeant Major of the Marine Corps
 Master Chief Petty Officer of the Navy
 Chief Master Sergeant of the Air Force
 Chief Master Sergeant of the Space Force
 Senior Enlisted Advisor to the Chief of the National Guard Bureau

References

External links
Master Chief Petty Officers of the Coast Guard
Master Chief Petty Officer's official website

Military ranks of the United States Coast Guard
United States military enlisted ranks
Senior Enlisted Advisor